Ecorys is one of the oldest economic research and consulting companies in Europe. Its history dates back to 1929, when a group of businessmen from Rotterdam established the Foundation NEI: The Netherlands Economic Institute. The goal of the Foundation NEI was to stimulate the collection and the analysis of economic data. One of its first directors (1935-1968) was Professor Jan Tinbergen, who was awarded the first Nobel Prize for Economics for his work in 1969. In 1999, NEI was split into a company, focusing on economic research & consultancy, and a foundation with the aim to foster economic research. The company merged with Kolpron Consultants (established in 1979).

In 2000 Ecorys was created through the merger of the Dutch company NEI Kolpron with ECOTEC Research and Consulting, a UK-based company specializing in social and environmental policy, founded by Frank Joyce and Hugh Williams OBE. ECOTEC had several hundred employees in multiple offices across Europe and extensive contracts with regional, national and international governments. Ecorys internationalized further and today has offices in many European countries as well as in Turkey and India. It has close to 500 employees.

Sectors 
Ecorys aims to make a positive impact on society by tackling the issues that affect communities around the world through our work in:

 Social Policy
 Regions and Cities
 Transport and infrastructure
 Security and Justice
 Natural Resources
 Economic Growth
 Public Sector Reform

Offices 
Ecorys has offices all around the world.

Europe 

 Rotterdam (head office)
 Amsterdam
 London
 Birmingham
 Leeds
 Brussels
 Warsaw
 Madrid
 Zagreb
 Sofia

Asia 

 Ankara
 Delhi
 Bangladesh

Africa 

 Lusaka
 Ghana
 Tanzania
 Zimbabwe

References

Companies based in Rotterdam
Economic research institutes
Consulting firms established in 2000